Story Land is a theme park located in Glen, New Hampshire, which opened in 1954. The park is meant to appeal to children up to the pre-teen ages.

History
In the few years prior to opening, the founders, Bob and Ruth Morrell, had purchased a large number of dolls from Germany based on storybook characters. This was the basis for the park. Originally known as "Story Town", the park was renamed Story Land after its first year, due to another park in upstate New York of the same name. When it opened in 1954, the park had just one ride—an old fire truck, "Freddie the Fire Engine". The original design of the park, buildings, and attractions was done by local artist and art teacher Arlene "Topsy" Samuelson.

Story Land was operated by the family-owned Morrell Corporation from 1954 to 2007. After Stoney Morrell, son of the original owners, died, the park was sold to the Kennywood Entertainment Company. Kennywood was in turn bought by Parques Reunidos the following year. In 2009, it was placed under Parques Reunidos' American division, Palace Entertainment.

The park has multiple themed music soundtracks that play in specific areas of the grounds. These tracks are exclusive to the park, and most of the music was created by local composer Sharyn Ekbergh in the early 1990s.

During the park's 60th anniversary year, a new wooden roller coaster, Roar-o-Saurus, was opened.

In 2019, the park began hosting an event titled "Nostalgia Night". Guests 21 years or older were encouraged to re-create childhood memories and photos in the park after hours. Two Nostalgia Nights were held in 2019, with plans to continue in 2020.

Voyage to the Moon

After a year of study and preparation, Story Land announced in 1981 that it would add a new, original, state-of-the-art dark ride. Bob Morrell had seen a similar structure in a Florida cow field and was determined to add one to the park. The interior of the white fabric roof was painted black, and two of the creative collaborators on Heritage New Hampshire, artisans Peter Stone and David Norton, were hired to create the storyline and scenes inside. The dome took shape in 1981. The skeletal steel of the huge cannon was ready in winter 1982. "Space Fantasy", later renamed "Voyage To The Moon", officially opened in June 1983 after nearly three years of engineering and construction. Governor John Sununu shared the first five-minute voyage with Bob Morrell, riding in one of the bullet-shaped cars built by Bradley and Kaye of California. Each car had speakers to broadcast sound effects triggered by an antenna underneath, computer-synchronized with lighting effects. The cars moved slowly through the cannon on a chain-driven conveyance into the darkened dome, slowly winding back down through a series of fantasy scenes such as a candy land and a polka dot sea, each populated by friendly, animated, imaginary creatures.

By the mid-1990s, the high maintenance costs and low capacity of the Voyage to the Moon led to consideration of alternative uses for the domed structure. Story Land's only dark ride operated for about 15 years before the dome was converted to Professor Bigglestep's Loopy Lab play area during the winter of 1998–99. The Loopy Lab contains an indoor playground full of foam balls, giant vacuums and hoses, and compressed air cannons. The original blackened ceiling was replaced by an all-white one in 2008.

In recent years, a full ride-through of the former attraction has appeared on YouTube. One of the ride's original bullet-shaped cars can be found at a miniature golf course in nearby North Conway.

Heritage New Hampshire
Heritage New Hampshire, an attraction owned by the Morrell family and dedicated to New Hampshire history, was located next to Story Land for 30 years, opening on July 3, 1976, and closing on October 22, 2006.

Heritage New Hampshire was an interactive museum that featured several actors that would play the role of a person who impacted New Hampshire's history.  There was the captain of a tall ship from England, a woodsman, a newspaper printer, Mathew Brady (famous Civil War photographer), an engineer of a steam train through Crawford Notch, and others. The museum also included an exhibit where guests could ride a Segway, since the manufacturer was based in Bedford, NH.

The Morrell family often directly employed British university graduates as actors under the auspices of the British Universities North America Club (BUNAC) "Work America" work exchange program for the summer season; this was a reciprocal arrangement which thus allowed American graduates to work in the UK during their vacations. The family was known for their hospitality and their foreign employees often featured in the Story Land yearbooks.

As guests would move in between different sections of the museum, they would see some video footage, some animatronics, and some exhibits.  There was a gift shop at the end of the museum tours. After the closure of Heritage New Hampshire, the building was used for storage by Story Land for a decade, and was then repurposed as Living Shores Aquarium.

Linderhof Motor Inn 

In the early 1970s, Swiss chalet-themed condos and motels were widely built throughout the Glen area. The largest Linderhof units were built just north of Story Land and were originally owned by couples Larry and Barbara LaReau and Jim and Kathy Sheehan. They owned the buildings for nearly 30 years, until they were bought by the Morrell family around 2000 and adopted into Morrell Family Attractions. The Morrell-owned Linderhofs consisted of three main buildings: reception and breakfast (the largest building), laundry and amenities (the smallest building), and the guest room building.

The buildings are now used as lodging for the park's overseas traveling cast members.

Living Shores Aquarium
Alterations on the building that had been Heritage New Hampshire started in the fall of 2017. In early 2018, it was announced that the facility was being repurposed to house an indoor public aquarium that would operate year-round. Living Shores Aquarium was slated to open in 2019.

Rides and attractions

Rides
 Huff Puff and Whistle Railroad, a  narrow-gauge ridable miniature railroad that serves as an attraction and shuttle service through the park. The trains are run in three sets of six cars in the colors red, green and blue, pulled by Chance Rides C.P. Huntington locomotives, numbered #2, #4, #18, and #47. #2 pulls the red trainset, #4 pulls the blue trainset, #47 pulls the green trainset, and #18 is used as an emergency back-up.
 Alice's Tea Cups
 Cinderella's Pumpkin Coach
 Story Land Queen (removed 2018)
 Pirate ship Buccaneer
 Antique German Carousel
 Los Bravos Silver Mine Tours
 Turtle Twirl
 Bamboo Chutes
 Polar Coaster
 Great Balloon Chase
 Crazy Barn
 Dr. Geysers Remarkable Raft Ride
 Flying Fish
 Antique Cars
 Swan Boats
 Eggs-traordinary Farm Tractors
 Cuckoo Clockenspiel
 Whirling Whales (removed 2016)
 Slipshod Safari Tour (re-themed as RapTour Safari in 2019)
 Dutch Flying Shoes
 Splash Battle Pharaoh's Reign
 Roar-o-Saurus

Attractions
Grandfather Tree (interactive playground, featuring animated elements)
Pirate Ship Playground
Horse Race Game (a themed Elton Games Roll-a-Ball game)
Shooting Gallery (featuring cameras instead of rifles)
Dutch Milking Cow
Oceans of Fun Sprayground
King Neptune's Crab Crawl (a themed Bob's Space Racers ramped water game)
Professor Bigglestep's Loopy Lab (play area and show area)
Dr Geyser's Mini Geysers
Little Dreamers Nursery Rhyme Play Area

Featured interactive nursery rhymes and fairy tales
"Humpty Dumpty"
"Mary Mary, Quite Contrary"
"The Old Woman in the Shoe" (Shoe and Character)
"Goldilocks and The Three Bears" (House) 
"Little Red Riding Hood" (Grandmother's House)
"Mary Had a Little Lamb" (School House)
"1,2 Buckle My Shoe"
"Little Miss Muffet"
"Peter, Peter, Pumpkin Eater"
"Cinderella" (Castle & Character)
"Heidi" (Grandfather's House & Character)
"Mother Goose Nursery Rhymes" (Character)

Animal attractions
"Mary Had a Little Lamb" – lambs
"Peter Rabbit" – rabbit
"Three Billy Goats Gruff" – goats
"Heidi" – goats
"Goosey Goosey Gander" – geese
"Chicken Little" – chickens
"Three Little Pigs" – pigs

A complete lists of Story Land rides can be found at their website.

References

Further reading

External links
 Story Land official website
 White Mountains Attractions Association

Amusement parks in New Hampshire
1954 establishments in New Hampshire
Palace Entertainment
Buildings and structures in Carroll County, New Hampshire
Tourist attractions in Carroll County, New Hampshire
Bartlett, New Hampshire
Amusement parks opened in 1954